Dawley Passage Provincial Park is a provincial park in British Columbia, Canada, located at the south end of Fortune Channel, which lies between Meares Island and the mainland of Vancouver Island just south. The park is to the north of the resort town of Tofino and is accessible by boat only.

The park's name comes from Dawley Passage which is a tidal narrows with strong currents and abundant marine life, which makes it popular for scuba diving.  Dawley Passage was named for Walter P. Dawley, a trader from Victoria who salvaged lumber from shipwrecks and at one time operated a store and hotel at Clayoquot and eventually owned stores at Ahousat, Nootka and Neuchatlitz Inlet.

See also
Epper Passage Provincial Park
Flores Island Marine Provincial Park
Gibson Marine Provincial Park
Vargas Island Provincial Park

References

BC Parks infopage

Clayoquot Sound region
Provincial parks of British Columbia
1995 establishments in British Columbia
Protected areas established in 1995